Extensor longus muscle may refer to:

 Extensor digitorum longus muscle
 Extensor hallucis longus muscle
 Extensor pollicis longus muscle